Kylie Allyssa Strom (born March 18, 1992) is an American professional soccer player who is a defender for Orlando Pride of the NWSL.

Strom played college soccer for Boston University from 2010 to 2013. She has previously played for Boston Breakers in the NWSL as well as in the Czech Republic with Sparta Prague and in Spain with Atlético Madrid.

Early life 
A native of Endicott, New York, Strom was born on March 18, 1992, to Richard and Roxanne Strom, and has one sibling, Corey. She played soccer at Union-Endicott High School and was named NY State Class AA Player of the Year and an NSCAA All-American as the team won two NY West State Cup titles. She also competed in track and field, qualifying for the state championship in the 400 meters during her sophomore and junior years. She played youth club soccer for Syracuse Surge Fury.

College 
Strom played four years of collegiate soccer for Boston University from 2010 to 2013. As a rookie she played in all 22 games including five starts as BU won both the America East regular season and tournament. She led the conference with nine assists including tying a single-game school record with three assists against Vermont on October 10, 2010, and finished the year with America East All-Rookie Team and AE All-Championship Team honors. As a sophomore in 2011, Strom started all 23 games and was named to the America East All-Conference First Team. Ahead of her senior season in 2013, Strom was named team captain. She started all 23 games and earned All-Patriot League First Team and Patriot League All-Tournament Team honors. Strom made a total of 86 appearances, scoring 14 goals and 17 assists.

Club career

FFC Frankfurt II, 2015 
Strom declared for the 2014 NWSL College Draft but was not selected. She joined the FFC Frankfurt II reserve team during the 2014–15 2. Bundesliga.

Boston Breakers, 2016–2017 
Strom returned to the United States after a season in Germany and joined the Boston Breakers Reserves having previously played on the Breakers' college academy team during her time at BU. On July 15, 2016, she was called up to the first team as an amateur national team replacement player and made her Breakers debut two days later as a 61st-minute substitute in a 3–2 defeat to Sky Blue FC. She was signed to a professional contract on August 29, 2016, and finished the season with seven appearances including three starts. Strom did not make any appearances in the 2017 season before being released on June 30, 2017, in order to clear a roster spot for Katie Stengel.

Sparta Prague, 2017–2019 
In August 2017, Kylie signed a professional contract with Czech Women's First League team Sparta Prague. In her first season with the team, Strom helped Sparta win their first league title in five years. Sparta also won their ninth Czech Women's Cup, beating Slovácko 3–1 in the final in which Strom was named Most Valuable Player. She was also named as the 2017–18 Czech Women's First League player of the season and club player of the season.

In May 2018, Strom signed a one-year extension ahead of the 2018–19 season. The team defended both the league and cup as Strom was voted as Sparta's player of the season for the second consecutive season. During the 2019 cup final, Strom scored Sparta's only goal in a 1–1 draw with rivals Slavia Prague but failed to convert her penalty in the ensuing penalty shoot-out. In June 2019, she signed another one-year contract with Sparta Prague.

Atlético Madrid, 2019–2021 
In August 2019, Strom was bought from Sparta Prague by Spanish Primera División side Atlético Madrid for an undisclosed fee. She scored her first goal for the club on September 26, 2019, during the second leg of the 2019–20 UEFA Women's Champions league round of 32. With Atlético trailing the game 1–0 to Serbian side Spartak Subotica, Strom scored an equalizer in the 83rd-minute to send Atlético through 4–3 on aggregate. After two seasons, Strom left upon the expiry of her contract.

Orlando Pride, 2021–present 
On July 5, 2021, Strom signed a two-year contract with Orlando Pride.

International 
In June 2014, Strom was called in to the 26-player United States under-23 training camp, the second Boston University player to receive an invitation to a National Team camp after Deidre Enos in 2011.

Personal life 
In September 2020, Strom joined Common Goal, a charity that pledges one percent of members' salaries to a collective fund that supports soccer charities around the world.

Career statistics

Club

Honors
Boston Terriers
America East regular season: 2010, 2011, 2012
America East Tournament: 2010, 2011
Patriot League Tournament: 2013

Sparta Prague
Czech Women's First League: 2017–18, 2018–19
Czech Women's Cup: 2018, 2019

Atlético Madrid
Supercopa de España: 2020–21

Individual
Czech Women's First League Player of the Year: 2017–18

References

External links
 Kylie Strom at NWSL
 Kylie Strom at Orlando Pride
 Kylie Strom at Boston University
 
 

1992 births
Living people
Women's association football defenders
American women's soccer players
People from Endicott, New York
Sportspeople from New York (state)
Soccer players from New York (state)
Expatriate women's footballers in the Czech Republic
Expatriate women's footballers in Spain
American expatriate soccer players in Germany
American expatriate sportspeople in the Czech Republic
American expatriate sportspeople in Spain
Boston University Terriers women's soccer players
Boston Breakers players
National Women's Soccer League players
1. FFC Frankfurt players
AC Sparta Praha (women) players
Czech Women's First League players
Atlético Madrid Femenino players
Primera División (women) players
Orlando Pride players
American expatriate women's soccer players
Women's association football fullbacks